Bavaria Moscow City Racing (or simply Moscow City Racing) is a motorsport show held in[Moscow from 2008. The main part of this show is demonstration racing of Formula One cars and cars from other racing series near Kremlin.

2008

Formula One
Red Bull Racing – Mikhail Aleshin
AT&T Williams – Nico Rosberg
Formula Drift
Formula RUS
Legends series
Bike racing series
Russian racing teams:
Lada Sport team
Lukoil Racing team
Uspenskiy Rally Tecnica (URT) team

2009
Formula One
Vodafone McLaren Mercedes – Heikki Kovalainen
Red Bull Racing – David Coulthard
AT&T Williams – Kazuki Nakajima
Rally raid
KAMAZ Master – Vladimir Chagin
Drift show
Bike racing show
Supercars parade
Retrocars parade

2010
Formula One
Vodafone McLaren Mercedes – Jenson Button
Renault F1 Team – Vitaly Petrov
Rally raid
KAMAZ Master – Vladimir Chagin
Team De Rooy – Gerard de Rooy
Le Mans Series
Spyker Squadron
Drift show
Bike racing show
Supercars parade

2011
Formula One
Scuderia Ferrari Marlboro – Giancarlo Fisichella
Team Lotus – Karun Chandhok and Luiz Razia
Vodafone McLaren Mercedes – Jenson Button
WRC
Citroën World Rally Team – Sébastien Ogier
Rally raid
KAMAZ Master
Drift show
Bike racing show
Formulec – Daniil Move and Alexander Premat
Formula JK Asia Series

External links

2008 establishments in Russia
2014 disestablishments in Russia
Sport in Moscow
Formula One
Motorsport competitions in Russia
Events in Moscow